The Continental Cup 2011–12 was the 15th edition of the IIHF Continental Cup. The season started on September 30, 2011, and finished on January 15, 2012.

The Super Final was played in Rouen, France on the 13–15 January 2012.

The points system used in this tournament was: the winner in regular time won 3 points, the loser 0 points; in case of a tie, an overtime and a penalty shootout is played, the winner in penalty shootouts or overtime won 2 points and the loser won 1 point.

First Group Stage

Group A
(Ankara, Turkey)

Group A standings

Note: HC Metulla of Israel was scheduled to compete, however they decided to retire from the tournament.

Second Group Stage

Group B
(Dunaújváros, Hungary)

Group B standings

Group C
(Miercurea Ciuc, Romania)

Group C standings

Third Group Stage

Group D
(Herning, Denmark)

Group D standings

Group E
(Donetsk, Ukraine)

Group E standings

Final stage

Final Group
(Rouen, France)

Final Group standings

References

External links
 Official IIHF tournament page

2011–12 in European ice hockey
IIHF Continental Cup